Fenderson is a surname.

List of people with the surname 

 Grace Baxter Fenderson (1883–1962), American educator and clubwoman
 James Fenderson (born 1976), former American football player
 Reginald Fenderson (1911–1968), American actor
 Tim Fenderson, American musician

See also 

 Henderson (surname)
 Fanderson

Surnames